KSL cells in cell biology are an early form of mouse/murine hematopoietic stem cells.  Characteristics are Kit (+), Sca-1 (+) and Lin (-). HSCs [Hematopoietic stem cells] in murine cultures show phenotypic markers as being CD34-, CD150+, and Flt3- for LTR [long-term reconstitution]. These phenotypic markers are used when purifying hematopoitic stem cells from the many other differentiated cells in the bone marrow. 

Kit (CD117) is the receptor of Stem Cell Factor. Sca-1 is a murine hematopoietic stem cell antigen. Lin is a series of lineage marker antigens that identify mature murine blood cells.

Hematopoitic stem cells are of interest because of their ability to self-renew and differentiate into every types of blood cell. Transplantation of these cells in the bone marrow can be used to treat leukemia and other diseases of the blood and immune system. Murine/mouse cells lines are used as a model to research treatments before they are tested on humans.

See also

Cell biophysics
Cell disruption
Cell physiology
Cellular adaptation
Cellular microbiology
Outline of cell biology

Notes

University of Toronto, Faculty of Immunology,
J. Dick lab: Nat Immunol. 2010, 11:585; Science. 2011, 33 3:218

Rossi L, Challen GA, Sirin O, Lin KK, Goodell MA. Hematopoietic stem cell characterization and isolation. Methods Mol Biol. 2011;750:47-59. 
doi: 10.1007/978-1-61779-145-1_3. PMID: 21618082; PMCID: PMC3621966.

Stem cells